Timothy Joseph Federowicz  (born August 5, 1987) is an American former professional baseball catcher. He played in Major League Baseball (MLB) for the Los Angeles Dodgers, Chicago Cubs, San Francisco Giants, Houston Astros, Cincinnati Reds, and Texas Rangers. He currently serves as the catching coach for the Detroit Tigers

Amateur career
A native of Apex, North Carolina, Federowicz attended Apex High School and the University of North Carolina at Chapel Hill. At North Carolina, he was a first team Freshman All-American in 2006. After the 2007 season, he played collegiate summer baseball with the Chatham A's of the Cape Cod Baseball League. As a junior at UNC in 2008, he hit .303 in 68 games. He was selected by the Boston Red Sox in the 7th round of the 2008 Major League Baseball draft.

Professional career

Boston Red Sox
He began his professional career with the Lowell Spinners in the New York–Penn League in 2008. He broke out in 2009 with the Greenville Drive, hitting .345 with 10 homers in 55 games and being named to the South Atlantic League mid-season all-star team. He was promoted to the Salem Red Sox in the Carolina League, where he played through 2010. In 2011, he began the year with the Double-A Portland Sea Dogs.

Los Angeles Dodgers
On July 31, 2011 he was traded to the Los Angeles Dodgers as part of a three-team trade that sent Érik Bédard to the Red Sox and Trayvon Robinson to the Seattle Mariners. 

The Dodgers assigned him to the Triple-A Albuquerque Isotopes. He was in 25 games for the Isotopes, hitting .325 with 6 home runs.

He was called up to the Dodgers on September 6, 2011 and made his major league debut on September 11, 2011 against the San Francisco Giants as a defensive replacement in the 8th inning. He struck out in his first major league plate appearance in the ninth inning against Waldis Joaquín.  On September 15, 2011, he had his first major-league start against the Pittsburgh Pirates and singled in the fifth against Ross Ohlendorf for his first major-league hit. He appeared in 7 games for the Dodgers, with 2 hits in 13 at-bats.

In 2012 with Albuquerque he hit .294 with 11 homers and 76 RBI in 115 games and was selected to the Pacific Coast League mid-season All-Star team and the post-season All-PCL Team. He returned to the Majors when the Dodgers called him up on September 1, and he had 1 hit in 4 at-bats for them at the end of the season. After the season, he played for the Tigres del Licey in the Dominican Winter League.

Federowicz made the Dodgers opening day roster in 2013 as the backup catcher to A. J. Ellis. However, he was optioned back to AAA after Ramón Hernández was acquired from the Rockies. He rejoined the Dodgers in June and became the full-time backup catcher after Hernández was released on June 14.

Federowicz hit his first major league home run on June 1, 2013 at Colorado, in the top of the 3rd inning against pitcher Jhoulys Chacín. In 56 games with the Dodgers in 2013, he hit .231 with 4 homers and 16 RBI.

In 2014, he was beaten out for the backup catcher job by Drew Butera and spent most of the season in AAA with the Isotopes. In 78 games for them, he hit .328 with 14 homers and 48 RBI. In limited action with the Dodgers, he hit .113 in 23 games.

San Diego Padres
On December 18, 2014, he was traded to the San Diego Padres (along with Matt Kemp and cash) for Yasmani Grandal, Joe Wieland, and Zach Eflin. During a spring training game, Federowicz suffered a tear in the lateral meniscus in his right knee, which caused him to miss the entire season. After being designated for assignment on August 1, 2015, he was sent to the Padres Triple-A El Paso Chihuahuas on August 11.

Chicago Cubs
Federowicz signed a minor league contract with the Chicago Cubs on January 14, 2016. He started the season with the Triple-A Iowa Cubs. He was brought up to the major league roster on April 28. Federowicz appeared in 17 games for the Cubs, finishing the year with a .194 batting average and three RBI. The Cubs would eventually win the World Series in seven games over the Cleveland Indians, ending their 108-year drought. Federowicz was not active during the postseason, but would still win a world championship for the first time in his career.

San Francisco Giants
Federowicz signed a minor league contract with the San Francisco Giants in December, 2016. On April 11, 2017, his contract was purchased by the Giants. Federowicz was designated for assignment on April 18, 2017. He elected free agency on November 6, 2017.

Houston Astros
On December 11, 2017, Federowicz signed a minor league contract with the Houston Astros. Federowicz was designated for assignment on June 8, 2018. He cleared waivers, as no team picked him up. Federowicz was designated for assignment on July 26, 2018. He elected to be a free agent in lieu of being designated for assignment in Triple-A Fresno Grizzlies.

Cincinnati Reds
On August 3, 2018, Federowicz signed a minor league deal with the Cincinnati Reds. On October 3, 2018, he was outrighted to the minors and removed from the Reds 40 man roster. He declared free agency on October 3, 2018.

Cleveland Indians
Federowicz signed a minor league contract with the Cleveland Indians on February 14, 2019. The deal includes an invitation to the Indians' major league spring training camp.

Texas Rangers
On June 7, 2019, Federowicz was traded to the Texas Rangers in exchange for a player to be named later or cash considerations. The Rangers selected his contract, adding him to their major league 25-man roster, on the same day. On August 1, Federowicz was designated for assignment. On August 3, Federowicz cleared waivers and was outrighted to the Nashville Sounds. On September 20, the Rangers selected his contract. He became a free agent following the 2019 season, but was re-signed to a minor league contract with an invitation to spring training on December 19, 2019. He became a free agent on November 2, 2020.

Los Angeles Dodgers (second stint)
On December 16, 2020, Federowicz signed a minor league contract with the Los Angeles Dodgers organization where he was assigned to the Triple-A Oklahoma City Dodgers. He played in only 25 games, missing time to play in the 2020 Summer Olympics and additional time on the injured list. He batted only .200 before he was released on September 4.

Coaching career

Seattle Mariners
On December 7, 2021, Federowicz announced his retirement from professional baseball, and announced that he would be serving as the manager for the Tacoma Rainiers, the Triple-A affiliate of the Seattle Mariners, for the 2022 season.

Detroit Tigers
On January 19, 2023, Federowicz was named the catching coach for the Detroit Tigers.

International career
In May 2021, Federowicz was named to the roster of the United States national baseball team for qualifying for baseball at the 2020 Summer Olympics. After the team qualified, he was named to the Olympics roster on July 2. Federowicz did not appear in the tournament, all catching being done by Mark Kolozsvary. He still received a silver medal, which the team secured after falling to Japan in the gold-medal game.

References

External links

1987 births
Living people
Baseball players from Pennsylvania
Sportspeople from Erie, Pennsylvania
Major League Baseball catchers
Los Angeles Dodgers players
Chicago Cubs players
San Francisco Giants players
Houston Astros players
Cincinnati Reds players
Texas Rangers players
North Carolina Tar Heels baseball players
Chatham Anglers players
Lowell Spinners players
Greenville Drive players
Tigres del Licey players
American expatriate baseball players in the Dominican Republic
Salem Red Sox players
Portland Sea Dogs players
Albuquerque Isotopes players
Mayos de Navojoa players
Fort Wayne TinCaps players
El Paso Chihuahuas players
Iowa Cubs players
Sacramento River Cats players
Fresno Grizzlies players
Louisville Bats players
Columbus Clippers players
Nashville Sounds players
Oklahoma City Dodgers players
United States national baseball team players
Baseball players at the 2020 Summer Olympics
Olympic baseball players of the United States
Medalists at the 2020 Summer Olympics
Olympic silver medalists for the United States in baseball